Mohammadabad-e Tabatabayi (also Romanized as Moḩammadābād-e Ţabāṭabāyī; also known as Moḩammadābād) is a village in Saman Rural District, Saman County, Chaharmahal and Bakhtiari Province, Iran. At the 2006 census, its population was 98, in 22 families. The village is populated by Persians and Turkic people.

References 

Populated places in Saman County